Unbreakable is the Backstreet Boys' sixth studio album (fifth in the United States). It was released on October 24, 2007, in Japan and October 30 in the United States by Jive Records.

This was the first of two consecutive Backstreet Boys albums as a quartet without Kevin Richardson (who departed from the group in 2006 to pursue other interests rejoining in 2012 for their 2013 album In a World Like This) and without involvement from longtime producers and friends Max Martin and Kristian Lundin, who have worked on all of the group's previous albums.

Background

In July 2007, it was announced that the Backstreet Boys would release a new album on October 30, 2007, their first album of new material in two years. Rumored titles of the album included End to Beginning, Picking Up the Pieces, and Motivation before Brian Littrell and A. J. McLean confirmed on August 13, 2007, that the title of the album would be Unbreakable. Producers include Dan Muckala, who produced the band's 2005 hit single "Incomplete", and Rob Wells. It is the first Backstreet Boys album that former member Kevin Richardson is not involved in, as he had left the group in June the previous year.

Footage of the Backstreet Boys in pre-production and recording the album was featured on the reality series House of Carters which documents Nick Carter reuniting his siblings in Los Angeles to try and reconnect as a family in between.

In an interview with INROCK magazine, Brian Littrell said the album would include various music styles, combining their earlier late-1990s sound with their more recent guitar-driven pop rock sound. Members of the Backstreet Boys themselves co-wrote five tracks on this album along with longtime songwriter Jeremy Carpenter from Kentucky, including "Intro". A. J. McLean revealed to MTV News at the Moto 8 Party in Hollywood that "The boys and I are finishing up the new record, coming out at the top of the year." "We're about three-quarters of the way through. We just got new mixes, we're just kind of going through the top eight [songs] we have right now, and getting the mix [done] properly. But everyone's really stoked about it. The songs are great, man."

On October 2, 2007, the tracks, "Unmistakable" and "Something That I Already Know" were released on Promosquad and RateTheMusic. The next day, a Japanese radio station leaked the intro of the album, along with the track, "Everything But Mine".

Music and composition

The Backstreet Boys fully abandoned the Max Martin sound of many of their early hits and, instead, worked with different producers to sound like an adult vocal group. Dan Muckala, producer and co-songwriter of the group's hit single "Incomplete" from their previous album Never Gone, produced the bulk of the material. However, other producers like Emanuel Kiriakou, John Shanks and Billy Mann also worked on the album. Fellow boy band veteran JC Chasez of *NSYNC collaborated with the Backstreet Boys, providing upbeat pop for the group with his production and songwriting.

The sound leans to adult contemporary and contemporary pop music and features interwoven choral harmonies, piano, strings, and use of guitar and drums.

The closing track of the album, "Unsuspecting Sunday Afternoon", is broken into two different parts. The first part leads off the album, and is a one-minute a cappella version of the chorus, listed as "Intro" on the record. The second track "Everything But Mine" is a synth-heavy dance track produced by Dan Muckala. It strays from typical BSB territory with its electro inspired offbeat riff. The third song and lead single "Inconsolable" was produced by Emanuel Kiriakou and written by Emmanuel, Lindy Robbins and Jess Cates. It features the trademark emotional boy band romantic lyrics with very heartfelt vocals. "Something That I Already Know" was described as "a classic Backstreet Boys pop-rock ballad". The song is co-written by Kara DioGuardi and David Hodges and it also features "slick power-ballad choruses." "Helpless When She Smiles" was produced by John Shanks and is another pop ballad. It is a more visionary offering with an intriguing piano melody that provides some edge. The sixth track "Any Other Way" traffics in clips of funk guitar and drums comparable to Maroon 5. It is a funk rocker with a minor-key tune.

"One in a Million", which conjures memories of the stuttering eight-note beats of "Larger Than Life", has elements of hip hop and reggae. The eighth track "Panic" add rock elements to the group's sound and is another more adventurous outing; beginning with a dubby drum and bass rhythm. "You Can Let Go" was described as a "dreamy" ballad, while "Trouble Is" was deemed as "another big ballad with a mildly rootsy groove, that could actually do well on country radio, where melodrama rules. The eleventh track "Treat Me Right" was deemed as "the standout track" on the album, which is generated via a co-writing/production credit from JC Chasez, member of *NSYNC. It is an electropop song and utilises the group's vocal interplay to admirable effect. "Love Will Keep You Up All Night" was classified as a "montage of almost every love-song ever written and with a chorus reminiscent of Aerosmith's 'I Don't Want to Miss a Thing'." "Unmistakable" was considered "one of the stronger tracks on the album." The song features very strong vocal arrangements and instrumentation. The second part of "Unsuspecting Sunday Afternoon" closes out the album, and is about three and half minutes in length. Commencing with only a piano, the song then adds a live drum beat and orchestral instruments, followed by an electric guitar solo and atmospheric harmonies. All four members co-wrote the song and hailed it as the best song in the album.

Promotion
"Inconsolable" was the first single from the album. The single hit the U.S. radio outlets on August 27, 2007. It was premiered by Jive at Z-100 - New York's Hit Music Station on August 6. It was written and produced by Emanuel Kiriakou, and co-written by SibeRya, Lindy Robbins and Jess Cates. "Helpless When She Smiles" was the second single from Unbreakable. It received airplay on WKSS in Hartford, Connecticut. According to rumors, the band had expressed discontent with the record label's decision to choose "Helpless When She Smiles" as the second single, feeling that it sounded too much like their previous singles, but Jive Records declined this. The video of "Helpless When She Smiles" was filmed on November 13, 2007, at the Joshua Tree National Park, California. The video premiered on Yahoo! Music on December 12, 2007.

Unbreakable Tour

The group embarked on a tour on February 16, 2008, in Japan, and finished on March 13, 2009, in Mexico. The tour consists of 99 shows in Asia, Australia, North America, East Europe, West Europe, and South America. The group also had shows planned in South Africa, but the shows were canceled following the death of Howie Dorough's father.

Critical reception

Unbreakable received generally mixed reviews from most music critics. At Metacritic, which assigns a normalized rating out of 100 to reviews from mainstream critics, the album received an average score of 56, based on 8 reviews. Bill Lamb from About.com gave the album 4 out of 5 stars, praising "the incomparably lush harmonies and instantly pleasing melodies" and labeling the songs "radio friendly." Lamb also commented that the band "have settled into a comfortable place as an adult vocal group" and named the album "a pure pop pleasure." Tammy LaGorce from Amazon.com judged that the album "boasts Super Glue-strength harmonies and an overall tightness of sound" and that "the music is more thoughtful and mature than ever." Simon Vozick-Levinson of Entertainment Weekly judged that "They come close to recreating the sheer euphoria of their biggest pre-2YK smashes on many of the up-tempo dance-pop numbers that follow." Stephen Thomas Erlewine from AllMusic gave the album 3 out of 5 stars, writing that "the basic sound of the album is good, but the problem is that few of the songs stick. Here, the Backstreet Boys don't have any songs that will lift them out of the adult contemporary world -- but the audience who has turned from teens to adults with them will likely enjoy its easy sound, as there is nothing bad here. There's just nothing great, either." Gemma Padley of BBC Music felt that the album "is a valiant effort at reinvention and an at times gutsier record."  Matt O'Leary from Virgin Media opined that "While there is nothing to match their crowning glory – karaoke classic "I Want It That Way" – this is a largely inoffensive collection of pop hits. It's bound to be huge." Lauren Murphy from Entertainment.ie called Unbreakable "far from the perfect pop album - in fact, it's rather boring for the most part - but it does confirm that Backstreet Boys aren't quite ready for the scrap heap just yet." Christian Hoard from Rolling Stone gave the album 2 out of 5 stars, summarizing that "Unbreakable makes small nods to adult pop, peppering the processed music with tasteful piano and light guitar riffs and keeping bright, danceable grooves to a minimum. But the material stinks worse than ever."

Commercial performance
In the United States, the album debuted at number seven, selling about 81,000 copies in its first week, becoming their sixth consecutive top ten album following Never Gone in 2005. As of March 2015, the album has sold 229,000 copies in the United States.

In Japan, the album sold 102,043 copies in its first week and went to number one on the Oricon weekly charts. In its second week, the album maintained its number one position beating all of the domestic Japanese competition, a remarkable feat for a foreign band. In Japan, it has sold, 400,000 copies. Worldwide, the album has sold 1,500,000 copies.

Track listing

Notes
  signifies a vocal producer

Personnel
Credits adapted from album's liner notes. The track numbers correspond to the Australia, Europe, Mexico & Canada deluxe edition.

Backstreet Boys
 Nick Carter
 Howie Dorough
 Brian Littrell
 AJ McLean

Additional personnel

 Mitch Allan – producer, guitar, bass, and guitar engineer (track 4)
 Adam Anders – producer and bass (track 13)
 Chris Anderson – engineer (track 17)
 David Angell – violin (track 16)
 Monisa Angell – viola (track 16)
 Steve Beers – assistant engineer (tracks 2, 7, 8, 14)
 Zukhan Bey – programming (track 4)
 Stevie Black – strings (track 4)
 Chris Brooke – drums engineer (track 3)
 Paul Bushnell – bass (tracks 5, 10)
 Chuck Butler – electric guitar (tracks 2, 6, 8, 9, 13, 14, 16), bass guitar (tracks 2, 6, 7, 9, 14, 16), acoustic guitar (tracks 7–9)
 John Catchings – cello (track 16)
 Doug Certa – bass engineer and piano engineer (track 4)
 Dan Chase – drum programming (tracks 5, 10)
 JC Chasez – vocal producer and vocal arranger (track 11)
 Ed Cherney – drums engineer (track 15)
 Vinnie Colaiuta – drums (tracks 5, 10)
 Dave Colvin – assistant engineer (track 4)
 Tom Coyne – mastering
 Dorian Crozier – drums (tracks 3, 4, 15)
 David Davidson – violin (tracks 13, 14, 16)
 Kara DioGuardi – producer (track 4)
 Steve Durkee – engineer and mixing (track 11)
 Theron "Neff-U" Feemster – producer and programming (track 12)
 Lars Fox – Pro Tools editor (tracks 5, 10)
 Larry Gold – strings arranger (track 12)
 Matty Green – engineer (track 3)
 David Hodges – producer, additional engineering, piano, and keyboards (track 4)
 Greg Johnston – guitar and bass (track 17)
 Nik Karpen – mixing assistant (tracks 1, 4, 5, 8, 9)
 Emanuel Kiriakou – producer, acoustic guitar, electric guitar, bass, piano, keyboards, programming, and percussion (tracks 3, 15); engineer (track 15)
 Adam Lester – electric guitar (tracks 6, 7, 13, 16)
 Lee Levin – drums (track 12)
 Chris Lord-Alge – mixing (tracks 2–10, 12, 13, 15–17)
 Jeremy Lutito – drums (tracks 2, 6, 9)
 Billy Mann  – producer, arranger, engineer, and guitars (track 12)
 Buckley Miller – mixing assistant (track 14)
 Kevin Mills – assistant engineer (track 5, 10)
 Dan Muckala – producer, engineer, and keyboards (tracks 2, 6–9, 13, 14, 16); arranger (tracks 2, 6, 7, 13, 14); programming (tracks 2, 7, 8, 13, 16); piano (tracks 9, 13, 14)
 Josh Muckala – assistant engineer (tracks 2, 6–9, 13, 14, 16), electric guitar (track 7)
 Jamie Muhoberac – keyboards (tracks 5, 10)
 Brian Naguit – assistant engineer (track 17)
 Brett Paschke – engineer (track 15)
 Brian Paturalski – vocal engineer (track 4)
 Jeff Pitzer – assistant engineer and violin (track 16)
 Jason Rankins – engineer (track 17)
 Jeff Rothschild – engineer (tracks 5, 10), drum programming (track 10)
 Dave Schuler – arranger, engineer, and guitars (track 12)
 John Shanks – producer, keyboards, and guitar (tracks 5, 10)
 F. Reid Shippen – mixing (track 14)
 Pam Sixfin – violin (track 16)
 Shari Sutcliffe – contractor and production coordinator (tracks 5, 10)
 Pat Thrall – engineer and digital editing (tracks 3, 15)
 David Thompson – additional guitar (track 17)
 Mary Katherine Vandosdale – violin (track 16)
 Pete Wallace – engineer and piano (track 12)
 Brian Warwick – assistant drums engineer (tracks 3, 15)
 Rob Wells – producer and programming (track 17)
 Kristin Wilkison – viola (track 16)

Charts

Weekly charts

Certifications

Release history

References

2007 albums
Backstreet Boys albums
Jive Records albums
Albums produced by John Shanks
Albums produced by Emanuel Kiriakou
Albums produced by Theron Feemster
Albums recorded at Westlake Recording Studios